Limbert Méndez Rocha (born August 18, 1982 in Trinidad, Bolivia) is a Bolivian football defender.

International career
He represented his country in 2 FIFA World Cup qualification matches.

References

External links
 
 
 
 

1982 births
Living people
People from Trinidad, Bolivia
Bolivian footballers
Bolivia international footballers
Association football defenders
C.D. Jorge Wilstermann players
Club Aurora players
Club Blooming players
Club Real Potosí players
Club San José players
Universitario de Sucre footballers